The name Bilis was used for two tropical cyclones in the northwestern Pacific Ocean. The name was submitted by the Philippines and means "speed" or "swiftness".

 Typhoon Bilis (2000) (T0010, 18W, Isang), a Category 5 super typhoon which caused 71 deaths and $668 million in damage in Taiwan and China
 Tropical Storm Bilis (2006) (T0604, 05W, Florita), a severe storm which caused 859 deaths and $4.4 billion in damage in the Philippines, Taiwan, and China. 

The name "Bilis" was retired by the ESCAP/WMO Typhoon Committee following the 2006 typhoon season, and replaced with "Maliksi".

Pacific typhoon set index articles